Brownsville is an unincorporated community in Brownsville Township, Union County, in the U.S. state of Indiana.

History
The post office at Brownsville has been in operation since 1821.

Geography

References

Unincorporated communities in Union County, Indiana
Unincorporated communities in Indiana